Banpur railway station is a railway station on the Ranaghat–Gede line of the Kolkata Suburban Railway system and operated by Eastern Railway. It is situated beside Banpur–Majhdia Road at Banpur village of Nadia district in the Indian state of West Bengal. Number of EMUs stop at Banpur railway station. The distance between Sealdah to this station is approximately 111 km.

History
The Ranaghat– section was the part of the Eastern Bengal Railway which was opened in 1862 and extended to Kushtia, now in Bangladesh. This was the Calcutta–Siliguri main line but after Partition of India in 1947, this got truncated and what remained India named the Gede Branch Line. The line including Banpur railway station was electrified in 1997–98.

References 

Sealdah railway division
Railway stations in Nadia district
Kolkata Suburban Railway stations